Paul Hollander (3 October 1932 – 9 April 2019) was a Hungarian-born  political sociologist, communist-studies scholar, and non-fiction author. He is known for his criticisms of communism and left-wing politics in general.

Background 
Born in 1932 in Budapest, he lived in Hungary with his Jewish family. When the Nazis persecuted Jews throughout the city, he had to hide from them when he was 12. His family was deported to work, after the communists came to power.

He fled to the West during the Hungarian Revolution of 1956 was bloodily put down by Soviet forces. First he escaped Austria and then to England.

Career
Hollander earned a Ph.D in Sociology from Princeton University, 1963 and a B.A. from the London School of Economics, 1959. He was Professor of Sociology at the University of Massachusetts Amherst and a Center Associate of the Davis Center for Russian and Eurasian Studies at Harvard University.

The anti-communist scholar wrote many books and articles. He is best known for his works Political Pilgrims: Western Intellectuals In Search of the Good Society, published in 1981, and Anti-Americanism, published in 1992.

He was a member of the national advisory council of the Victims of Communism Memorial Foundation.

Bibliography

Books

Political Pilgrims (1981)
The Many Faces of Socialism (1983)
The Survival of the Adversary Culture (1988)
Decline and Discontent (1992)
Anti-Americanism: Critiques at Home and Abroad (1992)
Political Will and Personal Belief: The Decline and Fall of Soviet Communism (1999)
Discontents: Postmodern and Postcommunist (2002)
The End of Commitment (2006)
The Only Super Power (2009) 
Extravagant Expectations (2011)
From Benito Mussolini to Hugo Chávez: Intellectuals and a Century of Political Hero Worship (2016)
Editor
American and Soviet Society (1969)
Understanding Anti-Americanism (2004)
From the Gulag to the Killing Fields (2006) 
Political Violence: Belief, Behavior and Legitimation (2008)

Articles

References

Further reading
"Which God Has Failed", The New Criterion (February 2002)

External links

Hollander at the Davis Center at Harvard University.
Hollander articles at New Criterion

 Video of lecture at The Heritage Foundation . Washington, D.C. 06.28.06.  Mr. Hollander explains that while communism was developed to create a new sense of community, a more accurate description of the political ideology would be "violence with a higher purpose."

1932 births
2019 deaths
American male non-fiction writers
American political writers
American sociologists
Harvard University people
Hungarian emigrants to the United States
American people of Hungarian-Jewish descent
Princeton University alumni
Quadrant (magazine) people
University of Massachusetts Amherst faculty
Political sociologists
20th-century social scientists
21st-century social scientists
Hungarian anti-communists
Alumni of the London School of Economics
Jewish American social scientists
21st-century American Jews